Aḥmad ibn Faḍlān ibn al-ʿAbbās ibn Rāšid ibn Ḥammād, commonly known as Ahmad ibn Fadlan (or Ibn Foszlan in older European literature), was a 10th-century Muslim traveler, famous for his account of his travels as a member of an embassy of the Abbasid caliph, al-Muqtadir of Baghdad, to the king of the Volga Bulgars, known as his  ("account" or "journal").

His account is most notable for providing a detailed description of the Volga Vikings, including eyewitness accounts of life as part of a trade caravan and witnessing a ship burial. He also notably described the lifestyle of the Oghuz turks while the Khazaria, Cumans, and Pechnegs were still around.

Ibn Fadlan's detailed writings have been cited by numerous historians. They have also inspired entertainment works, including Michael Crichton's novel Eaters of the Dead and its film adaptation The 13th Warrior.

Biography

Background
Ahmad ibn Fadlan was described as an Arab in contemporaneous sources. However, the Encyclopedia of Islam and Richard N. Frye add that nothing can be said with certainty about his origin, his ethnicity, his education, or even the dates of his birth and death.

Primary source documents and historical texts show that Ahmad Ibn Fadlan was a faqih, an expert in Islamic jurisprudence and faith, in the court of the Abbasid Caliph al-Muqtadir. It appears certain from his writing that prior to his departure on his historic mission, he had already been serving for some time in the court of al-Muqtadir. Other than the fact that he was both a traveler and a theologian in service of the Abbasid Caliphate, little is known about Ahmad Ibn Fadlan prior to 921 and his self-reported travels.

The embassy
Ibn Fadlan was sent from Baghdad in 921 to serve as the secretary to an ambassador from the Abbasid Caliph al-Muqtadir to the iltäbär (vassal-king under the Khazars) of the Volga Bulgaria, Almış.

On 21 June 921 (11 safar AH 309), a diplomatic party led by Susan al-Rassi, a eunuch in the caliph's court, left Baghdad. Primarily, the purpose of their mission was to explain Islamic law to the recently converted Bulgar peoples living on the eastern bank of the Volga River in what is now Russia. Additionally, the embassy was sent in response to a request by the king of the Volga Bulgars to help them against their enemies, the Khazars. Ibn Fadlan served as the group's religious advisor and lead counselor for Islamic religious doctrine and law.

Ahmad Ibn Fadlan and the diplomatic party utilized established caravan routes toward Bukhara, now part of Uzbekistan, but instead of following that route all the way to the east, they turned northward in what is now northeastern Iran. Leaving the city of Gurgan near the Caspian Sea, they crossed lands belonging to a variety of Turkic peoples, notably the Khazar Khaganate, Oghuz Turks on the east coast of the Caspian, the Pechenegs on the Ural River and the Bashkirs in what is now central Russia, but the largest portion of his account is dedicated to the Rus, i.e. the Varangians (Vikings) on the Volga trade route. All told, the delegation covered some 4000 kilometers (2500 mi).

Ibn Fadlan's envoy reached the Volga Bulgar capital on 12 May 922 (12 muharram AH 310). 
When they arrived, Ibn Fadlan read aloud a letter from the caliph to the Bulgar Khan and presented him with gifts from the caliphate. At the meeting with the Bulgar ruler, Ibn Fadlan delivered the caliph's letter, but was criticized for not bringing with him the promised money from the caliph to build a fortress as defense against enemies of the Bulgars.

Ethnographic writing

Manuscript tradition
For a long time, only an incomplete version of the account was known, transmitted as quotations in the geographical dictionary of Yāqūt (under the headings Atil, Bashgird, Bulghār, Khazar, Khwārizm, Rūs), published in 1823 by Christian Martin Frähn.

Only in 1923 was a manuscript discovered by Zeki Velidi Togan in the Astane Quds Museum, Mashhad, Iran. The manuscript, Razawi Library MS 5229, dates from the 13th century (7th century Hijra) and consists of 420 pages (210 folia). Besides other geographical treatises, it contains a fuller version of Ibn Fadlan's text (pp. 390–420). Additional passages not preserved in MS 5229 are quoted in the work of the 16th century Persian geographer Amīn Rāzī called Haft Iqlīm ("Seven Climes").

Neither source seems to record Ibn Fadlān's complete report. Yāqūt offers excerpts, and several times claims that Ibn Fadlān also recounted his return to Bagdad, but does not quote such material. Meanwhile, the text in Razawi Library MS 5229 breaks off part way through describing the Khazars.

Account of the Volga Bulgars
One noteworthy aspect of the Volga Bulgars that Ibn Fadlan focused on was their religion and the institution of Islam in these territories. The Bulgar king had invited religious instruction as a gesture of homage to the Abbasids in exchange for financial and military support, and Ibn Fadlan's mission as a faqih was one of proselytization as well as diplomacy.

For example, Ibn Fadlan details in his encounter that the Volga Bulgar Khan commits an error in his prayer exhortations by repeating the prayer twice. One scholar calls it an "illuminating episode" in the text where Ibn Fadlan expresses his great anger and disgust over the fact that the Khan and the Volga Bulgars in general are practicing some form of imperfect and doctrinally unsound Islam. In general, Ibn Fadlan recognized and judged the peoples of central Eurasia he encountered by the possession and practice of Islam, along with their efforts put forth to utilize, implement, and foster Islamic faith and social practice in their respective society. Consequently, many of the peoples and societies to Ibn Fadlan were "like asses gone astray. They have no religious bonds with God, nor do they have recourse to reason".

Account of the Rus'

A substantial portion of Ibn Fadlan's account is dedicated to the description of a people he called the Rūs (روس) or Rūsiyyah. Though the identification of the people Ibn Fadlān describes is uncertain, they are generally assumed to be Volga Vikings; the traders were likely of Scandinavian origin while their crews also included Finns, Slavs, and others. The Rūs appear as traders who set up shop on the river banks nearby the Bolğar camp. They are described as having bodies tall as (date) palm-trees, with blond hair and ruddy skin. Each is tattooed from "the tips of his toes to his neck" with dark blue or dark green "designs" and all men are armed with an axe, sword and long knife.

Ibn Fadlan describes the Rus as "perfect" physical specimens and the hygiene of the Rūsiyyah as disgusting and shameless, especially regarding to sex (which they perform openly even in groups), and considers them vulgar and unsophisticated. In that, his account contrasts with that of the Persian traveler Ibn Rustah, whose impressions of the Rus were more favourable, although it has been attributed to a possibly intentional mistranslation with the original texts being more in line with Ibn Fadlan's narrative. He also describes in great detail the funeral of one of their chieftains (a ship burial involving human sacrifice). Some scholars believe that it took place in the modern Balymer complex.

Editions and translations
(In chronological order)
 
 [from Razawi Library MS 5229]
 [Includes photographic reproduction of Razawi Library MS 5229.]

  [French translation, including additions to the text of Razawi Library MS 5229 from Yāqūt's quotations.]
 

 
 [Translates the section on the Rūsiyyah.]

 
 Aḥmad ibn Faḍlān, Mission to the Volga, trans. by James E. Montgomery (New York: New York University Press, 2017),

Appearances in popular culture
Ahmad Ibn Fadlān is a major character in Michael Crichton's 1976 novel Eaters of the Dead, which draws heavily on Ibn Fadlān's writings in its opening passages. In the 1999 film adaptation of the novel, The 13th Warrior, Ibn Fadlān is played by Antonio Banderas.

Ibn Fadlān's journey is also the subject of the 2007 Syrian TV series Saqf al-Alam.

Samirah "Sam" al-Abbas, a main character from Magnus Chase and the Gods of Asgard, as well as her betrothed, Amir Fadlan, are said to be descendants of Ahmad ibn Fadlan.

See also
Nabidh

Notes

References

Sources

External links 
 

9th-century Arabs
9th-century businesspeople
10th-century Arabs
10th-century businesspeople
10th-century people from the Abbasid Caliphate
10th-century travelers
10th-century writers
870s births
960 deaths
Arab explorers
Date of birth unknown
Date of death unknown
Explorers of Asia
Geographers from the Abbasid Caliphate
Travel writers of the medieval Islamic world
Writers from Baghdad
Year of birth uncertain
Year of death uncertain
Foreign relations of the Abbasid Caliphate